Meghalayan cuisine is the local cuisine of the Indian state of Meghalaya. Meghalaya is home to three tribes; it has a unique cuisine, different from the other Seven Sister States of northeast India. The staple food of the people is rice with spicy meat and fish preparations. They rear goats, pigs, fowl, ducks and cows and relish their meat. 

The dishes of Khasis and Jaintia are Jadoh, Ki Kpu, tung rymbai, and pickled bamboo shoots; bamboo shoots are also a favorite dish of the Garos. Garos eat both domesticated and non-domesticated animals, though their everyday staples are simple foods such as rice with kapa, cooked with a special ingredient called purambhi masala.

References

Cuisine
Northeast Indian cuisine
Indian cuisine by state or union territory